Lindsley is a surname. Notable people with the surname include:

Adrian Van Sinderen Lindsley (1814–1885), businessman, politician, member of the Tennessee Senate from 1868 to 1869
Blake Lindsley (born 1973), American actress
James Girard Lindsley (1819–1898), U.S. Representative from New York
John Berrien Lindsley (1822–1897), American educator, President of the now-defunct University of Nashville from 1855 to 1897
Lawrence Denny Lindsley (1879–1974), American photographer and also worked as a miner, hunter, and guide
Ogden Lindsley (1922–2004), American psychologist
Philip Lindsley (1786–1855), American educator, Vice President of the College of New Jersey (later known as Princeton University) from 1822 to 1824, and as the first President of the now-defunct University of Nashville from 1824 to 1850
William D. Lindsley (1812–1890), U.S. Representative from Ohio

See also
Lindsley House (disambiguation)
Linsley (disambiguation)